The Tanzanian Pill Bug Millipede, (Arthrosphaera brandtii), is a species of pill millipede in the family Arthrosphaeridae. It is found in many African and Asian countries including India and Sri Lanka. Mature individuals of the species reach 3–4 cm in length. Adults are pale brown in colour with black lines in between the segments, whereas juveniles are dark brown. The species is one of the most commonly kept giant pill millipede species within the exotic pet keeping hobby. An introduced population of Arthrosphaera brandtii exists on the Usambara Mountains of Tanzania.

References

External links
Chromosome studies on two endemic pill-millipedes of the genus Arthrosphaera (Diplopoda: Sphaerotheriida) from the Western Ghats of India

Sphaerotheriida
Millipedes of Asia
Animals described in 1865